Jordan Alessandra Crugnale (born 1969) is an Australian politician. She has been an Australian Labor Party member of the Victorian Legislative Assembly since November 2018, representing the seat of Bass.

Before her election, she was a teacher and served as mayor of Bass Shire Council.

References

1969 births
Living people
Australian Labor Party members of the Parliament of Victoria
Members of the Victorian Legislative Assembly
Women members of the Victorian Legislative Assembly
Mayors of places in Victoria (Australia)
21st-century Australian politicians
People from Albany, Western Australia
21st-century Australian women politicians
Labor Left politicians